Alestorm are a Scottish heavy metal band formed in Perth, Scotland. Their music is characterised by a pirate theme, and as a result, they have been dubbed a "pirate metal" band by many critics and their fanbase. The group currently consists of lead vocalist/keytarist Christopher Bowes, bassist Gareth Murdock, drummer Peter Alcorn, keyboardist/harsh vocalist Elliot Vernon and guitarist Máté "Bobo" Bodor.

After signing to Napalm Records in 2007, their debut album Captain Morgan's Revenge, was released on 25 January 2008. Black Sails at Midnight, the band's second album, was released on 27 May 2009. The band's third album, Back Through Time, was released on 3 June 2011. The fourth album from the band, Sunset on the Golden Age, was released in August 2014. Their fifth album No Grave But the Sea was released on 26 May 2017. Their sixth album, Curse of the Crystal Coconut, was released on 29 May 2020. Their seventh and most recent album, Seventh Rum of a Seventh Rum was released on 24 June 2022. 

The band has also released one live album and five EPs. The lead vocalist Christopher Bowes provides the announcer voice for the Pirate team in the video game Pirates, Vikings and Knights II.

History

Battleheart and origins (2004–2007)
The band was founded in 2004 in Perth, Scotland as Battleheart, a studio project by Christopher Bowes and Gavin Harper. Originally intended as a standard power metal band, the success of song "Heavy Metal Pirates" convinced the band to permanently adopt a pirate theme and incorporate folk metal elements into their music. Gavin and Christopher recorded & released two independent demos in 2006, which were received well by the local metal community. The band began to perform live in 2006, with a lineup consisting of Bowes (vocals and keytar), Harper (guitars), Dani Evans (bass) and Doug Swierczek (drums). Doug Swierczek eventually left the band later that year and was replaced by Ian Wilson. After a period of inactivity, in late 2007 Battleheart sent their demos to Napalm Records, and the band was promptly offered a record deal.

Alestorm (2007–present) 

After being signed by Napalm Records, the band changed their name from Battleheart to Alestorm. Their debut studio album, Captain Morgan's Revenge, was released in early 2008. The album featured the drummer of the band Incubator, Migo Wagner as the session drummer. The album was also produced by Incubator guitarist Lasse Lammert.

In April 2008, the band released the single "Heavy Metal Pirates". Drummer Ian Wilson left in June 2008 and later rejoined in August of the same year. By September 2008, original guitarist Gavin Harper had left the band. Tim Shaw was Harper's replacement, but after a brief period of touring, was fired from the band. To fill the guitarist position, Dani Evans switched instruments from bass to guitar, and Gareth Murdock of Waylander joined as the replacement bassist. The band's second studio album Black Sails at Midnight was released in May 2009. The album peaked at #60 on the GfK Entertainment charts. In March 2010, Ian Wilson left the band and was replaced with a new drummer named Peter Alcorn. Alestorm's third album, Back Through Time, was Alcorn's first appearance on an Alestorm album. Alestorm went on a Back Through Time World Tour starting in Australia and New Zealand. The album reached #42 on the German Albums Chart. In October 2011, Elliot Vernon joined the band as keyboard player and performing screamed / death metal vocals.

The band released their fourth record entitled "Sunset on the Golden Age" on 1 August 2014, reaching the #1 position in the UK Rock Chart.

Dani Evans retired from the band in April 2015, and was replaced by Hungarian guitarist Máté Bodor of the band Wisdom, who is also a part of Leander Kills.

In October 2016, Christopher Bowes announced during a concert on the Super Smashed Turbo Tour that the band planned to begin recording a fifth studio album in January 2017. The fifth record, entitled "No Grave But the Sea", was released on 26 May 2017. The album peaked at #1 on Billboard's Top Heatseekers Albums chart.

On 8 January 2020, the band announced the title of their sixth studio album, "Curse of the Crystal Coconut". This was released on 29 May 2020. On 30 April, the band released an EP titled, "The Treasure Chest EP". Prior to the album's release, Alestorm released the singles "Treasure Chest Party Quest" on 2 April 2020, "Tortuga" (feat. Captain Yarrface of Rumahoy) on 23 April 2020, and "Fannybaws" on 14 May 2020. The fourth single for the album titled, "Pirate Metal Drinking Crew" was released on 29 May 2020. The album peaked at #68 on the Official Albums Chart. A deluxe version of the album includes the normal track listing, along with what is referred to as "16th Century Version" editions of each track was released. On 6 August, The Wooden Box was released and it included two bonus tracks on a 7-inch Single which are "Big Ship Little Ship" and "Bassline Junkie". On 28 May 2021, the band released their second live album, "Live in Tilburg".

On 16 January 2022, the band announced that they entered the studio to record their seventh studio album, Seventh Rum of a Seventh Rum. On 31 January 2022, the band released a music video for the song "Zombies Ate My Pirate Ship", a song from their sixth album, "Curse of the Crystal Coconut". On 13 March 2022, the band announced that their seventh studio album will be released on 24 June 2022. On 6 April 2022, the band released the lead single, "Magellan's Expedition". On 4 May 2022, the band released the second single, "P.A.R.T.Y.". On 1 June 2022, the band released the third single, "The Battle of Cape Fear River. On 22 June 2022, the band released the fourth single, "Seventh Rum of a Seventh Rum".

Musical style

Alestorm is generally classified as pirate metal, folk metal, power metal, heavy metal, hard rock, and folk. Alestorm has also included elements of pop, rap metal, nu metal, progressive metal, thrash metal, symphonic metal, cock rock, death metal, symphonic black metal, metalcore, black metal, extreme metal, and Finnish folk music in their music.

The band refer to themselves as "True Scottish Pirate Metal" and are identifiable by the pirate-themed lyrics in their songs. Alestorm's music utilizes the upbeat epic style of Scottish folk metal and power metal. Album recordings feature heavy use of real trumpets, trombones, accordions synths, fiddle and tin whistle, violins, vibraslaps, brass, keytars, and singalong choruses to convey a pirate sea shanty feel. Alestorm's lyrical themes focus on pirates themes including, sailing, pillaging, and drinking.

The band's later albums incorporate screaming and death growls performed by keyboard player Elliot Vernon, as well from guest vocalists such as Ken Sorceron and Mathias Lillmåns.

Band members

Current members

 Christopher Bowes – lead vocals, keytar (2004–present)
 Gareth Murdock – bass, backing vocals (2008–present)
 Peter Alcorn – drums (2010–present)
 Elliot Vernon – keyboards, unclean vocals, backing vocals (2011–present)
 Máté Bodor – guitars, backing vocals (2015–present)

Former members

 Gavin Harper – guitars (2004–2008)
 Dani Evans – bass (2006–2008), guitars (2008–2015)
 Doug Swierczek – drums (2006)
 Ian Wilson – drums (2007–2008, 2008–2010)
 Alex Tabisz – drums (2008)
 Tim Shaw – guitars (2008)

Touring musicians

 Heri Joensen – vocals (2009)

Session musicians

 Brendan Casey – bass (2008), backing vocals (2008–present)
 Migo "Oger Mampf" Wagner – drums (2008–2009)
 Chris Mummelthey – backing vocals (2008)
 Gordon Krei – programming, brass and orchestral arrangements (2009–present)
 Tobias Hain – trumpet (2009–present)
 Bee Bloodpunch – backing vocals (2009)
 Austus Twele – great highland bagpipes (2009)
 Heinrich Gimpel – bass trombone (2009)
 Carsten Petersen – trumpet, cornet (2009)
 Mirjam Beyer – violin (2009)
 Florian Frambach – trumpet (2011)
 Derek Fobaire – trombone (2011)
 Hans-Jørgen Martinus Hansen – whistles (2011)
 Maria Odvody – violin (2011)
 Chris Jones (II) – accordion (2011)
 Jan Philipp Jacobs – trombone (2017–present)

Timeline

Discography

Studio albums

 Captain Morgan's Revenge (2008)
 Black Sails at Midnight (2009)
 Back Through Time (2011)
 Sunset on the Golden Age (2014)
 No Grave But the Sea (2017)
 Curse of the Crystal Coconut (2020)
 Seventh Rum of a Seventh Rum (2022)

Tours 

 March 2008 – UK Tour supporting Turisas and Norther
 October 2008 – "Ragnarok Aaskereia" European tour with Tyr, Hollenthon, Svartsot and Gwydion
 February – March 2009 – "Pagan Knights" North American tour with Týr and Suidakra
 April – May 2009 – "Black Sails Over Europe" European tour supported by Tyr, Heidevolk and Adorned Brood
 September 2009 – "Paganfest" European tour with Korpiklaani, Moonsorrow, Unleashed, Die Apokalyptischen Reiter, Einherjer, Ex Deo and Swashbuckle
 November 2009 – "Heathenfest" North American tour Eluveitie, Belphegor, Vreid, and Kivimetsan Druidi
 December 2009 - UK tour with Eden's Curse and The Rotted.
 February – March 2010 – "Paganfest" European tour with Finntroll, Eluveitie, Dornenreich, Varg and Arkona 
 June 2010 – "Plunder Down Under" Australian Tour supported by Claim the Throne
 August – December 2010 – "World War Tour" European Tour supporting Sabaton
 May 2011 – "Back Through Time" Australian Tour supported by Voyager
 August 2011 – "Pandemonium Over North America" North American tour supporting Kamelot
 September – October 2011 – "Heidenfest" European tour with Turisas, Wintersun, Finntroll, Arkona, and Trollfest
 February 2012 – "Useless Drunken Bastards" UK Tour supported by Claim the Throne and Darkest Era
 April 2012 – "Paganfest" North American tour with Turisas and Arkona
 September 2012 – "The Power Within" UK tour supporting DragonForce with the Defiled
 October 2012 – "The North American Enigma" North American tour with Epica and Insomnium
 January 2013 – "Live at the End of the World" Australia and New Zealand tour
 November – December 2013 – North American tour supported by Trollfest and Gypsyhawk
 September 2014 – "Storming Across Europe" European Tour supported by Brainstorm, Crimson Shadows and Troldhaugen
 October 2014 – "Piratefest" UK tour supported by Lagerstein, Red Rum, and Rainbowdragoneyes
 January 2015 – "Piratefest" North American tour supported by Swashbuckle and the Dread Crew of Oddwood
 November 2015 – "Piratefest" Australia and New Zealand tour supported by Lagerstein and Troldhaugen
 February – March 2016 – "Heroes on Tour" Europe and UK co-headlining tour with Sabaton
 October 2016 – "Super Smashed Turbo Tour" North American tour supported by Nekrogoblikon and Æther Realm
 June – August 2017 – Vans Warped Tour North American tour
 September – October 2017 – "No Grave But the Sea" headline European tour supported by Æther Realm and Troldhaugen
 February 2018 – "Piratefest 2018" UK and Ireland tour supported by Rumahoy and the Dread Crew of Oddwood
 August 2018 - Bloodstock Open Air Festival Saturday main stage
 September 2018 - North American Tour supported by Gloryhammer
 November - December 2018 - "Skälstorm European Tour" supported by Skálmöld
 February 2019 - Australian Tour supported by Rumahoy
 November 2021 - UK and Ireland Tour supported by Gloryhammer and Bootyard Bandits
 June 2022 - Download Festival Sunday Main Stage

References

External links

 
Alestorm at Napalm Records
Video Interview with Alestorm from Metal Gods TV
Interview with Alestorm from Teeth of the Divine
"ALESTORM Interview with Dani Evans", Xplosive Metal, June 2011, Caroline Restiaux

Scottish folk metal musical groups
Scottish power metal musical groups
Musical groups established in 2004
Napalm Records artists
Articles which contain graphical timelines
Musical quintets
Pirates in popular culture
Musicians from Perth, Scotland